Stathmopoda mysteriastis is a moth of the family Stathmopodidae. It was described by Edward Meyrick in 1901. It is found in New Zealand.

References

Moths described in 1901
Stathmopodidae
Moths of New Zealand
Endemic fauna of New Zealand
Endemic moths of New Zealand